The Vine Street Expressway Bridge was built in 1959 and reconstructed 1989 by the Pennsylvania Department of Transportation.  It carries Interstate 676 (Vine Street Expressway) over the Schuylkill River, CSX Transportation tracks, and a North 24th Street ramp, in Philadelphia, Pennsylvania.

See also
 
 
 
 
 List of crossings of the Schuylkill River

References

Bridges in Philadelphia
Bridges over the Schuylkill River
Bridges completed in 1959
Road bridges in Pennsylvania
U.S. Route 30
Bridges on the Interstate Highway System
Bridges of the United States Numbered Highway System
Interstate 76 (Ohio–New Jersey)
Steel bridges in the United States
Girder bridges in the United States